PT ASDP Indonesia Ferry (Persero) is an Indonesian state-owned passenger ferry operator. The company is headquartered in Central Jakarta and has 29 branches in 4 regional offices across Indonesia. As of 2020, it operates 160 ships throughout Indonesia, serves 49 million passengers, making it one of the largest ferry operators in the world.

History 
ASDP was originally established during the reign of President Soeharto, precisely in 1973 which was carried out by the PASDF (Proyek Angkutan Sungai, Danau, dan Ferry — River, Lake and Ferry Transportation Project) under the auspices of the Directorate of River, Lake and Ferry Transportation Traffic (DLLASDF), Directorate General of Land Transportation of Ministry of Transportation. Soeharto wanted to connect the land route from Banda Aceh in northernmost corner of Sumatra to Lospalos in easternmost corner of Timor Island.

On its journey PASDF was changed to PASDP (Proyek Angkutan Sungai Danau dan Penyeberangan — River, Lake, and Crossing Transportation Project) in 1980 and in 1992 it changed to PT Angkutan Sungai Danau dan Penyeberangan (Persero). In 2004 its name changed into PT ASDP Indonesia Ferry (Persero), as part of a business transformation process and branding.

Fleet and ports 

As of 2019, ASDP owned and operated 151 ships as well as 34 dedicated ferry ports across Indonesia.

References

External links
 Official website (in Indonesian)
 Official website (in English)
 Ferizy.com - ASDP Indonesia Ferry booking website

Indonesian waterways
Ferry transport in Indonesia
Shipping companies of Indonesia
Government-owned companies of Indonesia
Public transport in Indonesia
Indonesian companies established in 1973
1973 establishments in Indonesia